Michau Warriors were a South African football club who played in the Premier Soccer League.

They were relegated in the competition's inaugural season finishing in 17th place.

The following season they finished second in the National First Division coastal stream.

The club were based in Port Elizabeth.

References 

Former Premier Soccer League clubs

Former National First Division clubs
Soccer clubs in Port Elizabeth